Pointy Records is a London-based independent record label, founded in 1998 by Andy Macleod. Largely focusing on new music, Pointy Records have been releasing albums and singles of cult indie bands, most notably The Clientele, Flotation Toy Warning and Yo Zushi, for a period of ten years. A live music promotion wing, Club Fandango, was started with the Fierce Panda label's Simon Williams in 2001. This was later expanded to include a singles-only record label, Label Fandango.

Roster

Pointy records
 Tim Ten Yen
 The Clientele
 Yo Zushi
 Flotation Toy Warning
 Ladybug Transistor
 Cathead
 Color Filter
 Campag Velocet
 Tall Tree 6ft Man

See also 
 Lists of record labels
 List of independent UK record labels

References

External links
Official Pointy Records website (UK)

British independent record labels
Record labels established in 1998
Indie rock record labels